This is a list of episodes of the Adult Swim animated television series Sealab 2021. The show ran for four seasons from December 21, 2000 to April 24, 2005.

Series overview

Episodes

Original pilot 
An untitled pitch pilot for the series was produced, and while never aired on television, it was later released on the Season 1 DVD.

Season 1 (2000–02) 
Prior to the creation of the Adult Swim programming block, three episodes aired at various early morning times on Cartoon Network.

Season 2 (2002–03)

Season 3 (2003–04)

Season 4 (2004–05)

Unaired episodes

References 

Sealab 2021
Sealab 2021